is a Japanese actress and former gravure idol, formerly known as .

Biography
Kazuki's career began when she became one of the first phase members of the idol group Hop Club in 2001. In 2002 she was chosen among 15,000 people for Miss Magazine'''s Grand Prix. Kazuki later moved to Horipro's Tokyo headquarters from Osaka in 2003. She was challenged at directing for Film Factory.

In November 2009, Kazuki's writing debut was the children's mystery novel Uranai × Tantei''. She was in charge for the draft, such as the characters and settings, and it was written by a team.

Kazuki married director Tomoyuki Kuramoto in the 3 July 2011. She later left Horipro and in 2014 she returned as an actress and now belongs to Tom company. It was reported that Kazuki had given birth to a girl on the 19 September 2016.

On January 1, 2020, Kazuki announced that she would start working under her real name, Sayako Kuramoto.

Discography

Singles

Videos

Filmography

TV dramas

Films

TV series

Radio

Anime television

Anime films

Stage

Advertisements

Image character

Video games

Publications

Photobooks

Mook

References

External links
 

Japanese gravure models
Japanese television personalities
Japanese voice actresses
1983 births
Living people
Voice actors from Shiga Prefecture
Voice actresses from Shiga Prefecture
21st-century Japanese singers
21st-century Japanese women singers
21st-century Japanese actresses